Needs Convenience is a chain of convenience stores throughout Atlantic Canada.

The Needs logo and trademark are owned by Sobeys. Individual stores are operated by independent franchisees. Sobeys is the exclusive supplier to the chain.

Many stores operate from 6am-midnight; however, there are some 24-hour locations in larger urban centres. The Needs chain has installed gasoline stations at some locations using either the Ultramar Limited, Shell or Sobeys Fast Fuels brands.

History
The Needs Convenience chain developed from a series of small acquisitions by Sobeys, beginning with the TRA wholesale business in Middleton, Nova Scotia. By the mid-1990s, Needs stores were appearing throughout Atlantic Canada. The Sobeys-owned Green Gables chain was changed over to Needs by the late 1990s as part of a final effort to consolidate the region's up-scale convenience store market.

During the early 2000s, Sobeys experimented with converting several Needs stores to the Sobeys Express brand on a limited trial basis. The trial was unsuccessful and the stores reverted to the Needs brand; however, several stores are now being branded as Needs Convenience Extra or Needs Convenience Plus.

See also
 Foodland and FreshCo for other Sobeys-owned grocery stores.
 Riteway, Kwik-Way, and Clover Farm for other Sobeys-owned convenience store brands operated by franchisees.

References

External links
Needs Convenience Stores

Canadian brands
Convenience stores of Canada
Companies based in Nova Scotia
Franchises
Sobeys
Year of establishment missing

Cuisine of Atlantic Canada
Food and drink companies based in Nova Scotia